Pedro Henrique Cortes Oliveira Góis (born 17 January 1992), commonly known as Pedro Henrique, is a Brazilian-born East Timorese professional footballer who plays as a forward for Liga 1 side Persikabo 1973.

Club career

Youth career
Born and raised in São Paulo, Brazil, Pedro began his career as a football player in 2004 with Brazilian top club, São Paulo FC where he played for the next three years. In 2008, he moved to Rio Claro-based Rio Claro Futebol Clube and in 2009 he played for another Brazilian top club, Porto Alegre-based Grêmio Foot-Ball Porto Alegrense.

Mogi Mirim
In 2010, he began his professional footballing career with Mogi Mirim-based Mogi Mirim Esporte Clube. He scored 9 goals in 3 appearances in the 2011 Campeonato Paulista for the Mogi Mirim-based club.

Uberaba
In 2011, he moved to Uberaba-based Campeonato Mineiro club, Uberaba Sport Club. He made a substitute appearance for the club in the 2011 Campeonato Mineiro on 13 February 2011 in a 2–1 win over Guarani Esporte Clube. He also made a substitute appearance in the 2011 Copa do Brasil on 17 February 2011 in the First Phase in a 3–1 win over Santa Helena Esporte Clube.

Santacruzense
On 1 February 2013, he signed a two-month contract with Santa Cruz do Rio Pardo-based Campeonato Paulista Série A2 club, Associação Esportiva Santacruzense. He made his debut for the Santa Cruz do Rio Pardo-based club in a 2013 Campeonato Paulista Série A2 match on 24 February 2013 in a 2–1 loss against Associação Esportiva Velo Clube Rioclarense. He also made appearances in a 4–0 loss against Grêmio Osasco Audax Esporte Clube and a 2–1 loss against São Carlos Clube. He made 3 appearances in the 2013 Campeonato Paulista Série A2.

Petrolina Social

On 10 March 2013, he signed a two-month contract with Petrolina-based Campeonato Pernambucano club, Petrolina Social Futebol Clube. He made his debut for the Petrolina-based club on 14 March 2013 in a 2013 Campeonato Pernambucano match in 0–0 draw against Sport Club do Recife and scored his first goal on 31 March 2013 in a 1–1 draw against Belo Jardim Futebol Clube. He made 12 appearances and scored 2 goals in the 2013 Campeonato Pernambucano.

Al-Mesaimeer
He first moved out of Brazil in 2014 to the Middle East and more accurately to Qatar where he signed a one-year contract with Qatargas League club, Al-Mesaimeer Sports Club. He scored 9 goals in 12 appearances in the 2014–15 Qatar Second Division League finishing as the top scorer at the end of the mid-season.

Al-Oruba
On 28 January 2013, he signed a six-month contract with Oman Professional League club, Al-Oruba SC. He made his debut on 5 February 2015 in a 1–0 win over fierce rivals Sur SC, in a match that is also known as the Sur Derby. He made 6 appearances in the 2014–15 Oman Professional League for the Sur-based club.

PKNS

He scored 8 goals in 13 appearances in the 2015 Malaysia Premier League.

Club career statistics

International career

U-22 career

Pedro started his career with Timor-Leste national under-23 football team in 2013 at the 2013 Southeast Asian Games. He made his debut for the U-23 side in a 3–1 loss against Thailand U-23 and scored his first goal in a 3–2 win over Cambodia U-23. He also made appearances in a 3–1 loss against Myanmar U-23 and in a 0–0 draw against Indonesia U-23.

References

External links
Pedro Henrique at playmakerstats.com (English version of ogol.com.br and zerozero.pt)
Pedro Henrique - SOCCER PUNTER

1992 births
Living people
Footballers from São Paulo
East Timorese footballers
Brazilian footballers
Timor-Leste international footballers
East Timorese expatriate footballers
Brazilian expatriate footballers
Brazilian emigrants to East Timor
Association football forwards
Mogi Mirim Esporte Clube players
Uberaba Sport Club players
Associação Esportiva Santacruzense players
Mesaimeer SC players
Al-Orouba SC players
PKNS F.C. players
Pedro Henrique
Sepahan S.C. footballers
Daejeon Hana Citizen FC players
Ħamrun Spartans F.C. players
Victory Sports Club players
Pedro Henrique
Petaling Jaya City FC players
Sheikh Russel KC players
G.D. Sagrada Esperança players
Sri Pahang FC players
Pedro Henrique
Madura United F.C. players
Qatari Second Division players
Oman Professional League players
Malaysia Premier League players
Pedro Henrique
Persian Gulf Pro League
K League 2 players
Maltese Premier League
Pedro Henrique
Malaysia Super League players
Bangladesh Premier League players
Girabola players
Liga 1 (Indonesia) players
Expatriate footballers in Qatar
Brazilian expatriate sportspeople in Qatar
East Timorese expatriate sportspeople in Qatar
Expatriate footballers in Oman
Brazilian expatriate sportspeople in Oman
East Timorese expatriate sportspeople in Oman
Expatriate footballers in Malaysia
Brazilian expatriate sportspeople in Malaysia
East Timorese expatriate sportspeople in Malaysia
Expatriate footballers in Thailand
Brazilian expatriate sportspeople in Thailand
East Timorese expatriate sportspeople in Thailand
Expatriate footballers in Iran
Brazilian expatriate sportspeople in Iran
East Timorese expatriate sportspeople in Iran
Expatriate footballers in South Korea
Brazilian expatriate sportspeople in South Korea
Expatriate footballers in Malta
Brazilian expatriate sportspeople in Malta
Expatriate footballers in Bangladesh
Brazilian expatriate sportspeople in Bangladesh
Expatriate footballers in Angola
Brazilian expatriate sportspeople in Angola
Expatriate footballers in Indonesia
Brazilian expatriate sportspeople in Indonesia
East Timorese expatriate sportspeople in Indonesia